John or Jack Hendry or Hendrie may refer to:

John Hendry (industrialist) (1843–1916), Canadian lumber magnate
John Strathearn Hendrie (1857–1923), Canadian politician
John C. Hendry (died 1938), Scottish trade union leader
John V. Hendry, former chief justice of the Nebraska Supreme Court

Sports
John Hendry (footballer) (born 1970), Scottish footballer (Tottenham Hotspur, Motherwell FC)
John Hendrie (Australian footballer) (born 1953), Australian rules footballer
John Hendrie (Scottish footballer), (born 1963), Scottish footballer (Bradford City, Middlesbrough FC) and manager (Barnsley FC)
Jack Hendry (footballer, born 1867) (1867–1917), Scottish footballer (Notts County)
Jack Hendry (footballer, born 1995), Scottish footballer (Celtic FC, Club Brugge, national team)